Trinity Church Complex is a historic church off of Northern Boulevard in Roslyn, New York. It is located on the westbound off-ramp from the William Cullen Bryant Viaduct and Church Street, the latter of which also leads to the St. Mary's Roman Catholic Church of Roslyn, on the northeast corner of Bryant and Summit Avenues.

Description 
It was built in 1906 by the architectural firm of McKim, Mead & White, and also includes the 1951-established Roslyn-Trinity Cooperative Day School. The church complex was added to the National Register of Historic Places in 1986. In November 2016, a child care center opened at this site.

References

External links
Church website

Roslyn, New York
Churches on the National Register of Historic Places in New York (state)
Churches completed in 1906
20th-century Episcopal church buildings
Churches in Nassau County, New York
Episcopal church buildings in New York (state)
National Register of Historic Places in North Hempstead (town), New York
1906 establishments in New York (state)